Lorraine Vaillancourt,  (born September 23, 1947) is a Canadian pianist and conductor living in Quebec.

She was born in Arvida, Quebec and studied with Hélène Landry at the Conservatoire de musique du Québec à Québec and with Pierre Dervaux at the École Normale de Musique de Paris. Vaillancourt studied piano with Yvonne Loriod and Anne-Marie de Lavilléon-Verdier; she studied ondes Martenot with Jeanne Loriod. In 1970 she returned to the University of Montreal with the intention to learn from Serge Garant.

In 1971, Vaillancourt joined the faculty of music at the University of Montreal. From 1971 to 1973, she worked with Bruce Mather and Serge Garant; in 1974, she became director of the University of Montreal's contemporary music workshop, replacing Mather. From 1972 to 1975, she worked at the Atelier-laboratoire of the University. In 1989, she founded the Nouvel Ensemble Moderne, the ensemble-in-residence at the faculty of music at the University of Montreal, which has received numerous awards. She was also a founder of the concert society Événements du neuf.

She has been guest conductor for the Kitchener-Waterloo Symphony Orchestra, the Montreal Symphony Orchestra, the Orchestre Métropolitain and the Quebec Symphony Orchestra. Vaillancourt help found the contemporary music magazine Circuit.

From 2001 to 2006, she was a member of the board of the Conseil des arts et des lettres du Québec. She is also a member of the Royal Society of Canada. In 1995, she was named a Woman of Distinction by the YWCA. She conducted Les Percussions de Strasbourg's recording of music by Hugues Dufourt, which received the Prix Charles-Cros. In 2009, she was named an ambassador for the Canadian Music Centre. In 2016, she received the Prix Denise-Pelletier. In 2018, she was made a Knight of the National Order of Quebec.

References 

1947 births
Living people
Canadian women pianists
Knights of the National Order of Quebec
Musicians from Saguenay, Quebec
Prix Denise-Pelletier winners
Academic staff of the Université de Montréal
Women classical pianists
21st-century Canadian conductors (music)
21st-century Canadian pianists
21st-century Canadian women musicians
21st-century women pianists